William Valentine Wood worked for much of his life on the London, Midland and Scottish Railway (LMS), rising to become its President. He was known for his ability with numbers.

Biography
William Wood; Willie Wood to his railway colleagues and Val to his family, attended Methodist College, Belfast before joining the Northern Counties Committee (NCC) as an accountant. Here he expanded his interest to all matters relating to the railway. During World War I he worked for the government, and when the Ministry of Transport was created in 1919 he became its first director of finance. He later returned to railway work on the LMS, successor to the Midland Railway which had owned the NCC, where he became vice president (finance and services). When Josiah Stamp was killed in 1941, Wood was asked to take over as President, a post which he held until the nationalisation of the Railways in 1948. He then worked for five years with the British Transport Commission (BTC) whose Chairman, Sir Cyril Hurcombe, he had come to know during his time in the Ministry of Transport.

References

1959 deaths
1883 births
London, Midland and Scottish Railway people
People educated at Methodist College Belfast
Knights Commander of the Order of the British Empire